Cipangopaludina miyagii is a species of large, freshwater snail with an operculum and a gill, an aquatic gastropod mollusk in the family Viviparidae, the river snails. This freshwater snail found only in Southern part of Taiwan.

Taxonomy
This species was described by Tokubei Kuroda, the famous Japanese macalogist expertised in macalogy fauna of Taiwan during its occupation by Japan, in 1941. The freshwater snail is classified as a species of the genus Cipangopaludina, and was named after Mr. Miyagi, the one who caught the snail. The sample was caught in Takao Prefecture, which corresponds to the area of modern-day Kaohsiung City and Pingtung County. The current distribution of the species reflects that it exists in water near grassland of both area.

References 

 The National Checklist of Taiwan (Catalogue of Life in Taiwan, TaiCoL)

Viviparidae